Cordatijuxta is a genus of moths belonging to the family Tortricidae. It contains only one species, Cordatijuxta thailandiae, which is found in Thailand.

The wingspan is 16 mm. The ground colour of the forewings is yellowish cream in the anterior half and greyish brown in the posterior half except for costal area which is pale ferruginous. The costal divisions are rust brown and there is a brown spot at the end of the median cell. The hindwings are brownish cream, but browner on the periphery.

Etymology
The genus name refers to the shape of the juxta and is derived from Latin cordatus (meaning heart-shaped). The species is named after the country of origin.

See also
List of Tortricidae genera

References

External links
tortricidae.com

Tortricini